Heather Louise McCartney (born Heather Louise See; December 31, 1962) is an American-British potter and artist who is the daughter of Linda McCartney and adopted daughter of Sir Paul McCartney.

Biography
McCartney was born in Tucson, Arizona, US to Linda Eastman (later McCartney) and Joseph Melville See Jr., an American geologist. Her parents separated after 18 months of marriage, See divorced her mother raising no objection to her having full custody. When Eastman married Paul McCartney in 1969, Heather was six years old. During this time Heather was formally adopted by McCartney, with See's approval, acknowledging she would "have a better life as a McCartney." Heather made an appearance in the Beatles film Let It Be and documentary series Get Back. A half-sister, Mary, was born in 1969, followed by another half-sister, Stella, in 1971 and a half-brother, James, in 1977. Heather has said that her biological father had a lifelong influence on her, but that she considers Paul McCartney her father.

McCartney began showing an interest in art, taking up printing at the Photographers' Workshop in Covent Garden and winning the Young Black and White Printer of the Year Award for a photo she called "Waterfall". She later went to art school, where she focused on pottery and design. McCartney travelled to Mexico, where she lived among natives of the Huichol and Tarahumara tribes. She later moved to Arizona to live with her biological father and eventually returned to England to work as a potter.

Like her parents and half-siblings, McCartney is a vegetarian and passionate about animal rights.

In 1999, McCartney launched a line of houseware products called the Heather McCartney Houseware Collection.

Discography 
Heather has helped her adoptive father, Paul McCartney, with backing vocals on two of his albums.
 1971:  Ram, by  Paul and Linda McCartney.
 1995: Oobu Joobu Part 10 by Paul McCartney - Bootleg album on which she does the backing vocals on the song  S.M.A. 
 2013:  New, by Paul McCartney.

References

External links

Interview with Heather McCartney, The Daily Telegraph; February 6th, 1999

1962 births
American adoptees
American expatriates in the United Kingdom
American people of German-Jewish descent
American people of Russian-Jewish descent
20th-century American Jews
Living people
Heather
Artists from Tucson, Arizona
American expatriates in Mexico
21st-century American Jews